Pythium camurandrum is a plant pathogen, first isolated in Canada.

References

Further reading 
Petkowski, J. E., et al. "Pythium species associated with root rot complex in winter-grown parsnip and parsley crops in south eastern Australia."Australasian Plant Pathology 42.4 (2013): 403–411.

External links
 MycoBank

Water mould plant pathogens and diseases
camurandrum